Pu'er Simao Airport  is an airport serving the city of Pu'er in Yunnan Province, China.

Airlines and destinations

See also
List of airports in China

References

External links
Yunnan Airport Group

Airports in Yunnan
Transport in Pu'er